Ophichthus is a genus of eels in the snake eel family Ophichthidae.

Species
There are currently around 80 recognized species in this genus:

References

 
Ophichthidae
Taxa named by Jonas Niclas Ahl